The 1971 Individual Long Track World Championship was the first edition of the FIM speedway Individual Long Track World Championship. The event was held on 1 September 1971 in Oslo, Norway.

The world title was won by Ivan Mauger of New Zealand.

Final Classification 

Key
 E = Eliminated (no further ride)

References 

1971
Sports competitions in Oslo
Motor
Motor
1970s in Oslo
International sports competitions hosted by Norway